"Shake It" is a 2008 song by Metro Station.

Shake It may also refer to:

Albums
 Shake It..., by Endorphin, or the title song, 2004
 Shake It (EP), by Sistar, or the title song, 2015
 Shake It, by Gal Level, 2004

Songs
 "Shake It" (Iain Matthews song), 1978
 "Shake It" (Kaylan song), 2000
 "Shake It" (Kay Flock song), 2022
 "Shake It" (Sakis Rouvas song), representing Greece at Eurovision 2004
 "Shake It", by Aaron Carter from Aaron Carter, 1997
 "Shake It", by Bow Wow from New Jack City II, 2009
 "Shake It", by Caesars, 1995
 "Shake It", by Charli XCX from Charli, 2019
 "Shake It", by David Bowie from Let's Dance, 1983
 "Shake It", by MC Shy D from Comin' Correct in 88, 1988
 "Shake It (Move a Little Closer)", by Alex Cartana, 2003

Other uses
 Shake It Records, an Ohio record label and record store established in 1979
 Wario Land: Shake It!, a 2008 video game for the Wii

See also
 Shake (disambiguation)
 Shake It Off (disambiguation)
 Shake It Up (disambiguation)